is a subway station in Taitō, Tokyo, Japan, operated by Tokyo Metro. It is close to Minowabashi Station on the Tokyo Sakura Tram.

History

The station facilities were inherited by Tokyo Metro after the privatization of the Teito Rapid Transit Authority (TRTA) in 2004.

Lines

Station layout
The station consists of two opposed side platforms serving two tracks.

Platforms

Surrounding area
 Minowabashi Station (Tokyo Sakura Tram) (approximately 5 minutes' walk)
 San'ya district
 Yoshiwara district

References

External links

 Tokyo Metro station information 

Railway stations in Japan opened in 1961
Railway stations in Tokyo